Márcia Pellicano (born 1 July 1970) is a Brazilian sailor. She competed at the 1988 Summer Olympics in the women's 470, and both the 1992 Summer Olympics and the 1996 Summer Olympics in the Europe class. She is the older sister of fellow sailor Kiko Pellicano.

References

External links
 

1970 births
Living people
Brazilian female sailors (sport)
Olympic sailors of Brazil
Sailors at the 1988 Summer Olympics – 470
Sailors at the 1992 Summer Olympics – Europe
Sailors at the 1996 Summer Olympics – Europe
Sportspeople from Rio de Janeiro (city)
Pan American Games gold medalists for Brazil
Pan American Games medalists in sailing
Sailors at the 1995 Pan American Games
Medalists at the 1995 Pan American Games